John Sununu may refer to:

 John H. Sununu (born 1939), Governor of New Hampshire 1983–1989 and White House Chief of Staff for George H. W. Bush
 John E. Sununu (born 1964), his son, U.S. Congressman 1997–2003 and U.S. Senator